Guido Grimod (born 13 February 1951) is an Italian politician.

He is member of the Valdostan Union party and served as mayor of Aosta for two terms from May 2000 to May 2010.

See also
List of mayors of Aosta

References 

Living people
1951 births
People from Aosta
Valdostan Union politicians
20th-century Italian politicians
21st-century Italian politicians
Mayors of Aosta